Akshay Panda is an Indian politician. He was a Member of Parliament, representing Odisha in the Rajya Sabha, the upper house of India's Parliament, as a member of the Indian National Congress.

References

Rajya Sabha members from Odisha
Indian National Congress politicians
1937 births
Living people
Indian National Congress politicians from Odisha